LP II is the second album by the Minneapolis punk band The Soviettes.

Track listing

Side One
"Ten" – 1:18 
"#1 Is Number Two" – 1:50 
"Pass the Flashlight" – 1:37 
"Goes Down Easy" – 1:30 
"Winning Is for Losers" – 1:38 
"Angel A" – 1:42 
"Tonight" – 2:23

Side Two
"There's a Banana in My Ear" – 1:14 
"Love Song" – 1:02 
"Portland" – 1:59 
"Channel X" – 2:02 
"Whatever You Want" – 2:20 
"Don't Say No" – 1:27 
"Come on Bokkie!" – 1:13

All songs by the Soviettes

Personnel
Annie Holoien – guitar, vocals
Maren "Stugeon" Macosko – guitar, vocals
Danny Henry – drums, vocals
Susy Sharp – bass guitar, vocals

The Soviettes albums
Adeline Records albums
2004 albums